Cytora hirsutissima is a species of very small land snails with an operculum, terrestrial gastropod molluscs in the family Pupinidae.

Distribution 
This species occurs in New Zealand. It is classified under the New Zealand Threat Classification System as Nationally Critical.

References

Pupinidae
Gastropods of New Zealand
Gastropods described in 1951
Taxonomy articles created by Polbot